Pantaung Min was governor of Toungoo (Taungoo) from 1419 to 1420. He was previously governor of Pantaung, south of Prome (Pyay). He took office about a few months after his predecessor Thinkhaya II was killed in a raid by a small army from an eastern Shan state. He appeared to have been an interim governor as his overlord King Minkhaung I of Ava replaced him with Thinkhaya III about a year later. It is unclear if he still remained governor of Pantaung.

References

Bibliography
 
 

Ava dynasty